In mathematics, the square root of a matrix extends the notion of square root from numbers to matrices.

Some authors use the name square root or the notation  only for the specific case when  is positive semidefinite, to denote the unique matrix  that is positive semidefinite and such that  (for real-valued matrices, where  is the transpose of ).

Examples

In general, a matrix can have several square roots. In particular, if  then  as well.

The 2×2 identity matrix  has infinitely many square roots. They are given by
 and 
where  are any numbers (real or complex) such that .
In particular if  is any Pythagorean triple—that is, any set of positive integers such that , then
Thus
 

Minus identity has a square root, for example:
 
which can be used to represent the imaginary unit  and hence all complex numbers using 2×2 real matrices, see Matrix representation of complex numbers.

Just as with the real numbers, a real matrix may fail to have a real square root, but have a square root with complex-valued entries.
Some matrices have no square root. An example is the matrix 

While the square root of a nonnegative integer is either again an integer or an irrational number, in contrast an integer matrix can have a square root whose entries are rational, yet non-integral, as in examples above.

Positive semidefinite matrices

A symmetric real n × n matrix is called positive semidefinite if  for all  (here  denotes the transpose, changing a column vector  into a row vector).
A square real matrix is positive semidefinite if and only if  for some matrix .
There can be many different such matrices .
A positive semidefinite matrix  can also have many matrices  such that .
However,  always has precisely one square root  that is positive semidefinite (and hence symmetric).

For complex-valued matrices, the conjugate transpose  is used instead and positive semidefinite matrices are Hermitian, meaning . 

This unique matrix is called the principal, non-negative, or positive square root (the latter in the case of positive definite matrices).

The principal square root of a real positive semidefinite matrix is real.

The operation of taking the principal square root is continuous on this set of matrices. These properties are consequences of the holomorphic functional calculus applied to matrices.
The existence and uniqueness of the principal square root can be deduced directly from the Jordan normal form (see below).

Matrices with distinct eigenvalues
An  matrix with  distinct nonzero eigenvalues has 2n square roots.

Solutions in closed form 

If a matrix is idempotent, meaning , then by definition one of its square roots is the matrix itself.

Diagonal and triangular matrices
If  is a diagonal n × n matrix ,
then some of its square roots are diagonal matrices , where .
A diagonal matrix may have additional non-diagonal roots if some entries on the diagonal are equal, as exemplified by the identity matrix above.

Since the equation  should be satisfied, let  be the principal square root of the complex number .
By the assumption , this guarantees that  for all  (because the principal square roots of complex numbers all lie on one half of the complex plane).
From the equation
 
we deduce that  can be computed recursively for  increasing from 1 to n-1 as:
 

Note the diagonal entries of a triangular matrix are precisely its eigenvalues (see Triangular matrix#Properties).

By diagonalization 
An n × n matrix  is diagonalizable if there is a matrix  and a diagonal matrix  such that .
 

Indeed,
 

 has principal square root 
 ,

giving the square root
 .

When  is symmetric, the diagonalizing matrix  can be made an orthogonal matrix by suitably choosing the eigenvectors (see spectral theorem).

By Schur decomposition 
if at most one of them is zero, then the following is a square root
 
where a square root  of the upper triangular matrix  can be found as described above.

If  is positive definite, then the eigenvalues are all positive reals, so the chosen diagonal of  also consists of positive reals.

By Jordan decomposition 

To see that any complex matrix with positive eigenvalues has a square root of the same form, it suffices to check this for a Jordan block. Any such block has the form λ(I + N) with λ > 0 and N nilpotent. If  is the binomial expansion for the square root (valid in |z| < 1), then as a formal power series its square equals 1 + z. Substituting N for z, only finitely many terms will be non-zero and 
 gives a square root of the Jordan block with eigenvalue .

It suffices to check uniqueness for a Jordan block with λ = 1. The square constructed above has the form  where L is polynomial in N without constant term. Any other square root T with positive eigenvalues has the form T = I + M with  nilpotent, commuting with N and hence L. But then . Hence .

On each eigenspace,  has the form  as above. The power series expression for the square root on the eigenspace show that the principal square root of  has the form q(A) where q(t) is a polynomial with real coefficients.

Power series 
Recall the formal power series , which converges provided  (since the coefficients of the power series are summable). Plugging in  into this expression yields
 

provided that . This method of defining or computing  is especially useful in the case where  is positive semi-definite. This method remains valid to define square roots of operators on infinite-dimensional Banach or Hilbert spaces or certain elements of (C*) Banach algebras.

Iterative solutions

By Denman–Beavers iteration 

Another way to find the square root of an  matrix A is the Denman–Beavers square root iteration.

Let Y0 = A and Z0 = I, where I  is the  identity matrix. The iteration is defined by

As this uses a pair of sequences of matrix inverses whose later elements change comparatively little, only the first elements have a high computational cost since the remainder can be computed from earlier elements with only a few passes of a variant of Newton's method for computing inverses,

Convergence is not guaranteed, even for matrices that do have square roots, but if the process converges, the matrix  converges quadratically to a square root 1/2, while  converges to its inverse, −1/2.

By the Babylonian method 

Yet another iterative method is obtained by taking the well-known formula of the Babylonian method for computing the square root of a real number, and applying it to matrices. Let X0 = I, where I  is the identity matrix. The iteration is defined by

Again, convergence is not guaranteed, but if the process converges, the matrix  converges quadratically to a square root A1/2. Compared to Denman–Beavers iteration, an advantage of the Babylonian method is that only one matrix inverse need be computed per iteration step. On the other hand, as Denman–Beavers iteration uses a pair of sequences of matrix inverses whose later elements change comparatively little, only the first elements have a high computational cost since the remainder can be computed from earlier elements with only a few passes of a variant of Newton's method for computing inverses (see Denman–Beavers iteration above); of course, the same approach can be used to get the single sequence of inverses needed for the Babylonian method. However, unlike Denman–Beavers iteration, the Babylonian method is numerically unstable and more likely to fail to converge.

The Babylonian method follows from Newton's method for the equation  and using  for

Square roots of positive operators 

In linear algebra and operator theory, given a bounded positive semidefinite operator (a non-negative operator) T on a complex Hilbert space, B is a square root of T if T = B* B, where B* denotes the Hermitian adjoint of B.  According to the spectral theorem, the continuous functional calculus can be applied to obtain an operator T1/2 such that
T1/2 is itself positive and (T1/2)2 = T. The operator T1/2 is the unique non-negative square root of T.  

A bounded non-negative operator on a complex Hilbert space is self adjoint by definition. So  Conversely, it is trivially true that every operator of the form B* B is non-negative. Therefore, an operator T is non-negative if and only if T = B* B for some B (equivalently, T = CC* for some C).

The Cholesky factorization provides another particular example of square root, which should not be confused with the unique non-negative square root.

Unitary freedom of square roots 

If T is a non-negative operator on a finite-dimensional Hilbert space, then all square roots of T are related by unitary transformations. More precisely, if T = A*A = B*B, then there exists a unitary U such that A = UB.

Indeed, take B = T to be the unique non-negative square root of T. If T is strictly positive, then B is invertible, and so  is unitary:

If T is non-negative without being strictly positive, then the inverse of B cannot be defined, but the Moore–Penrose pseudoinverse B+ can be.  In that case, the operator   is a partial isometry, that is, a unitary operator from the range of T to itself.  This can then be extended to a unitary operator U on the whole space by setting it equal to the identity on the kernel of T.  More generally, this is true on an infinite-dimensional Hilbert space if, in addition, T has closed range. In general, if A, B are closed and densely defined operators on a Hilbert space H, and A* A = B* B, then A = UB where U is a partial isometry.

Some applications 

Square roots, and the unitary freedom of square roots, have applications throughout functional analysis and linear algebra.

Polar decomposition 

If A is an invertible operator on a finite-dimensional Hilbert space, then there is a unique unitary operator U and positive operator P such that

If A is not invertible, then it still has a polar composition in which P is defined in the same way (and is unique).  The unitary operator U is not unique.  Rather it is possible to determine a "natural" unitary operator as follows: AP+ is a unitary operator from the range of A to itself, which can be extended by the identity on the kernel of A∗.  The resulting unitary operator U then yields the polar decomposition of A.

Kraus operators 

By Choi's result, a linear map

is completely positive if and only if it is of the form

where k ≤ nm. Let {Epq} ⊂ Cn × n be the n2 elementary matrix units. The positive matrix

is called the Choi matrix of Φ. The Kraus operators correspond to the, not necessarily square, square roots of MΦ: For any square root B of MΦ, one can obtain a family of Kraus operators Vi by undoing the Vec operation to each column bi of B. Thus all sets of Kraus operators are related by partial isometries.

Mixed ensembles 

In quantum physics, a density matrix for an n-level quantum system is an n × n complex matrix ρ that is positive semidefinite with trace 1. If ρ can be expressed as

where  and Σ pi = 1, the set

is said to be an ensemble that describes the mixed state ρ. Notice {vi} is not required to be orthogonal. Different ensembles describing the state ρ are related by unitary operators, via the square roots of ρ. For instance, suppose

The trace 1 condition means

Let

and vi be the normalized ai. We see that

gives the mixed state ρ.

See also
 Matrix function
 Holomorphic functional calculus
 Logarithm of a matrix
 Sylvester's formula
 Square root of a 2 by 2 matrix

Notes

References 

 
 , Chapter IV, Reisz functional calculus
 
 
 
 
 
 
  

Matrix theory